Koikili Lertxundi del Campo (born 23 December 1980), known simply as Koikili or Koi for short, is a Spanish former professional footballer who played as a left-back.

A late bloomer, he only became a professional at the age of 26 after signing with Athletic Bilbao. Over a five-year spell with the club, he appeared in 98 competitive matches.

Career
Koikili was born in Otxandio, Basque Country. Playing Tercera División football just two seasons before moving to Athletic Bilbao, he was signed from Segunda División B side Sestao River Club for the start of 2007–08. He made his La Liga debut on 26 August, playing the full 90 minutes in a 0–0 home draw against Navarrese neighbours CA Osasuna, whose reserves he had already represented in the late 90s/early 2000s.

Koikili was first choice for much of the campaign, dislodging international Asier del Horno. On his 27th birthday he scored his first top-flight goal, in a 1–1 home draw against Real Murcia.

Koi appeared slightly less in the following two seasons for Athletic, but still totalled 52 official games (ten in the Copa del Rey, with the team reaching the final in the 2008–09 edition, and one in the newly created UEFA Europa League). On 11 January 2009, he netted the 1–1 at Atlético Madrid in an eventual 3–2 win.

Koikili was deemed surplus to requirements at Athletic in 2011–12 after the appointment of manager Marcelo Bielsa, alongside teammates Aitor Ocio and Iban Zubiaurre – he remained with the club, however. On 25 June 2014, he retired at age 33 after spending two Segunda División seasons at CD Mirandés.

Personal life
Koikili was a Greco-Roman wrestler in his youth, once being crowned Spanish champion at under-15 level.

Honours
Athletic Bilbao
Copa del Rey runner-up: 2008–09
Supercopa de España runner-up: 2009

References

External links

1980 births
Living people
People from Durangaldea
Sportspeople from Biscay
Spanish footballers
Footballers from the Basque Country (autonomous community)
Association football defenders
La Liga players
Segunda División players
Segunda División B players
Tercera División players
CD Aurrerá de Vitoria footballers
CA Osasuna B players
Gernika Club footballers
SD Beasain footballers
Sestao River footballers
Athletic Bilbao footballers
CD Mirandés footballers
Basque Country international footballers